The West Mainland of the Shetland Islands is the part of the Shetland Mainland lying west of Aith (1° 23′ W).

Geography
Points of interest include:

Aith
Twatt
Sandness
Walls
Easter Skeld
Reawick
Wester Skeld

References

Geography of Shetland
Mainland, Shetland